Jean-Joseph-François Tassaert (1765, Paris - c.1835) was a French painter and engraver. He was the son of Jean-Pierre-Antoine Tassaert, who also taught him, and the father and teacher of Octave Tassaert.

Works 
 After Fulchran-Jean Harriet, Paris, colour engraving, now in the Musée Carnavalet,La Nuit du 9 au 10 thermidor An II , Arrest of Robespierre, showing the gendarme Charles-André Merda firing the shot which broke Robespierre's jaw

1765 births
1835 deaths
18th-century engravers
19th-century engravers
French engravers
18th-century French painters
French male painters
19th-century French painters
French people of Flemish descent
19th-century French male artists
18th-century French male artists